Lori Hoey is a former England women's international footballer. She represented the England women's national football team at the 1987 European Competition for Women's Football and spent most of her career at  Friends of Fulham.

Honors
 Friends of Fulham
 FA Women's Cup: 1984–85

References

Living people
People from Clapham
English women's footballers
Fulham L.F.C. players
England women's international footballers
Women's association football fullbacks
Year of birth missing (living people)